The Bristol 45.5 is an American sailboat that was designed by Ted Hood and Dieter Empacher as a racer-cruiser, first built in 1979 and last built in 1989.

Production
The Bristol 45.5 was produced 1979–1989 and was replaced in production by the Bristol 47.7, which was built from approximately 1989 to 1994. Both are related designs, from the same hull molds, but the 47.7 was modified with a longer stern and a traditional transom as opposed to the 45.5's reverse transom.

The Bristol 45.5 was built by Bristol Yachts in Bristol, Rhode Island, United States. The company produced 75 examples of the 45.5 and 47.7 together, but it is now out of production.

Design
The Bristol 45.5 is a recreational keelboat, built predominantly of fiberglass, with wood trim. It has a masthead sloop rig, or an optional ketch rig, with aluminum spars. It features a raked stem, a raised counter reverse transom, a skeg-mounted rudder controlled by an Edson wheel and a fixed fin keel with retractable centerboard. It displaces  and carries  of lead ballast.

The design has a PHRF racing average handicap of 111.

References

Keelboats
1970s sailboat type designs
Sailing yachts
Sailboat type designs by Ted Hood
Sailboat type designs by Dieter Empacher
Sailboat types built by Bristol Yachts